Sommerliche Musiktage Hitzacker ("summerly music days Hitzacker") is the name of a traditional international festival of classical chamber music in Hitzacker, Lower Saxony, Germany. Founded in 1946, it is held annually for nine days beginning with the last weekend in July.

History 
The first festival was held in the summer of 1946, it is therefore regarded as the first chamber music festival in Germany. The first artistic director was the cellist Hans Döscher who directed the festival until his death in 1971. He focused the festival on chamber music, both Early music and contemporary. From 2012 to 2015, the violinist Carolin Widmann directed the festival. From 2016, Oliver Wille has been the director, a founding member of the Kuss Quartet and a professor of chamber music for strings at the Musikhochschule Hannover.

Program 
The program has included concerts of chamber music from medieval to regular premieres, new concert projects, literature, dance and film. Each year used to have a motto, such as "Europe" in 2009 and "Ins Labor" in 2010, presenting experiments in music, and music related to inventors. In 2016, the new director programmed without a motto, but focused on the festival as a meeting point and had the audience decide one concert program.

Premieres have included the Flute Concerto by Isang Yun on 30 July 1977, played by Karlheinz Zöller and conducted by Günther Weißenborn. Jörg Widmann's second string quartet, Choralquartett, was commissioned by the festival and premiered by the Keller Quartet on 29 July 2003.

Artists 
International artists who have appeared at the festival include "composers in residence" such as Krzysztof Penderecki in 2001, before Aribert Reimann, Olivier Messiaen, György Ligeti and Witold Lutosławski, also Heinz Holliger, Bernhard Lang, Helmut Lachenmann and  Wolfgang Rihm. Dieter Ammann was composer in residence in 2014.

Instrumentalists have included Anatol Ugorski, Boris Pergamenschikow, Dinorah Varsi, Rosamunde Quartet, Hilliard Ensemble, Stephen Kovachevich, Patricia Kopatchinskaja and Sol Gabetta, and Ensemble Modern. The conductor and pianist  received the Belmont Prize at the festival in 2009. Among the performers who appeared at the festival in the beginning of their career are Amadeus Quartet, Emerson String Quartet, Baiba Skride and Lauma Skride, and Carolin Widmann.

References

Further reading 
Lesle, Lutz: Sommerliche Musiktage Hitzacker. Edition Thomas Herms, Holm 1995.

External links 
 

Classical music festivals in Germany
Music festivals established in 1946
Recurring events established in 1946